Eucinetus is a genus of plate-thigh beetles in the family Eucinetidae. There are at least four described species in Eucinetus.

Species
These 16 species belong to the genus Eucinetus:
 Eucinetus bicolor Lawrence, 2019
 Eucinetus bicolorellus Lawrence, 2019
 Eucinetus brindabellae Lawrence, 2019
 Eucinetus dorrigo Lawrence, 2019
 Eucinetus haemorrhoidalis (Germar, 1818) g b
 Eucinetus limitaris Lawrence, 2019
 Eucinetus lorien Lawrence, 2019
 Eucinetus minutus Lawrence, 2019
 Eucinetus morio LeConte, 1853 i c g b
 Eucinetus nebulosus Lawrence, 2019
 Eucinetus protibialis Lawrence, 2019
 Eucinetus similis Lawrence, 2019
 Eucinetus strigosus LeConte, 1875 i c g b
 Eucinetus tasmaniae Lawrence, 2019
 Eucinetus tropicus Lawrence, 2019
Data sources: i = ITIS, c = Catalogue of Life, g = GBIF, b = Bugguide.net

References

Further reading

External links

 

Scirtoidea
Articles created by Qbugbot